Cornel Piper (April 2, 1937 – September 2, 2018) was a Canadian offensive lineman in the Canadian Football League from 1957 to 1967 for the Winnipeg Blue Bombers, named a western conference all-star at offensive guard in 1960 and 1961. He played in all 16 regular season games throughout his career except for his last 2 years.

Piper won four Grey Cups with Winnipeg.  

He died on September 2, 2018.

References

External links
Bio

1937 births
2018 deaths
Winnipeg Blue Bombers players
Players of Canadian football from Alberta
Canadian football offensive linemen
People from the Municipal District of Bonnyville No. 87